Saint-Martin-du-Bois may refer to the following places in France:

 Saint-Martin-du-Bois, Gironde, a commune in the Gironde department
 Saint-Martin-du-Bois, Maine-et-Loire, a commune in the Maine-et-Loire department